Belalabad may refer to:
 Belalabad, Sistan and Baluchestan